The 2019 Italian Open (also known as the Rome Masters or the Internazionali BNL d'Italia for sponsorship reasons) was a professional tennis tournament played on outdoor clay courts at the Foro Italico in Rome, Italy from 15 to 21 May 2019. It was the 76th edition of the Italian Open and was classified as an ATP Tour Masters 1000 event on the 2019 ATP Tour and a Premier 5 event on the 2019 WTA Tour.

Points and prize money

Point distribution

Prize money

ATP singles main-draw entrants

Seeds 
The following are the seeded players. Seedings are based on ATP rankings as of 6 May 2019. Rankings and points before are as of 13 May 2019.

The following players would have been seeded, but they withdrew from the event.

Other entrants
The following players received wildcards into the main draw:
  Andrea Basso
  Matteo Berrettini
  Jannik Sinner
  Lorenzo Sonego

The following player received entry using a protected ranking into the main draw:
  Jo-Wilfried Tsonga

The following players received entry from the qualifying draw:
  Dan Evans
  Taylor Fritz
  Yoshihito Nishioka
  Cameron Norrie
  Benoît Paire
  Albert Ramos Viñolas
  Casper Ruud

Withdrawals
Before the tournament
 Kevin Anderson → replaced by  Mikhail Kukushkin
 John Isner → replaced by  Radu Albot
 Milos Raonic → replaced by  Jan-Lennard Struff

During the tournament
 Roger Federer

ATP doubles main-draw entrants

Seeds

Rankings are as of May 6, 2019.

Other entrants
The following pairs received wildcards into the doubles main draw:
  Filippo Baldi /  Andrea Pellegrino
  Simone Bolelli /  Andreas Seppi
  Marco Cecchinato /  Lorenzo Sonego

The following pair received entry as alternates:
  Austin Krajicek /  Artem Sitak

Withdrawals
Before the tournament
  Fabio Fognini
  Lucas Pouille
During the tournament
  Diego Schwartzman

WTA singles main-draw entrants

Seeds

 Rankings are as of May 6, 2019.

Other entrants
The following players received wildcards into the main draw:
  Victoria Azarenka
  Elisabetta Cocciaretto
  Sara Errani
  Jasmine Paolini
  Venus Williams

The following players received entry from the qualifying draw:
  Mona Barthel
  Irina-Camelia Begu
  Alizé Cornet
  Polona Hercog
  Kristina Mladenovic
  Rebecca Peterson
  Maria Sakkari
  Tamara Zidanšek

The following player received entry as a lucky loser:
  Amanda Anisimova

Withdrawals
Before the tournament
  Bianca Andreescu → replaced by  Johanna Konta
  Camila Giorgi → replaced by  Barbora Strýcová
  Angelique Kerber → replaced by  Alison Riske
  Maria Sharapova → replaced by  Viktória Kužmová
  Donna Vekić → replaced by  Amanda Anisimova

During the tournament
  Naomi Osaka (right hand injury)
  Serena Williams (left knee injury)

Retirements
  Alizé Cornet (right thigh injury)
  Julia Görges (right thigh injury)
  Petra Kvitová (left calf injury)
  Garbiñe Muguruza (left thigh injury)
  Jeļena Ostapenko (viral illness)
  Caroline Wozniacki (left lower leg injury)

WTA doubles main-draw entrants

Seeds

Rankings are as of May 6, 2019.

Other entrants
The following pairs received wildcards into the doubles main draw:
  Deborah Chiesa /  Jasmine Paolini
  Sara Errani /  Martina Trevisan 
  Anastasia Grymalska /  Giorgia Marchetti

Withdrawals
During the tournament
  Anastasia Pavlyuchenkova (unspecified reasons)

Champions

Men's singles
 
  Rafael Nadal def.  Novak Djokovic, 6–0, 4–6, 6–1

Women's singles
 
  Karolína Plíšková def.  Johanna Konta, 6–3, 6–4

Men's doubles
 
  Juan Sebastián Cabal /  Robert Farah def.  Raven Klaasen /  Michael Venus, 6–1, 6–3

Women's doubles
 
  Victoria Azarenka /  Ashleigh Barty def.  Anna-Lena Grönefeld /  Demi Schuurs, 4–6, 6–0, [10–3]

References

External links
 Official website
 Official twitter

 
Italian Open
2019 in Italian tennis
Italian Open
2010s in Rome
Italian Open (tennis)
Italian Open